Niccolò Pierozzi (born 12 September 2001) is an Italian professional footballer who plays as a right-back for  club Reggina, on loan from Fiorentina.

Youth career
Born in Florence, Pierozzi was signed by Fiorentina as a youth player. He scored ten goals in 24 appearances on the U17 team in his first season.

Club career

Fiorentina

Pro Patria loan
He was a regular starter for the Fiorentina youth teams, and in 2021 he earned a loan move to Serie C side Pro Patria to play in Serie C Group A for the 2021–22 Serie C season. 
Pierozzi made his debut for Pro Patria against AlbinoLeffe in a 2–1 loss. He scored his first goal for the club in a 2–1 loss a month later against Padova.

In a match against Seregno, Pierozzi received a straight red card for a professional foul. Over the course of the season Pierozzi scored 8 league goals, helping Pro Patria to an eleventh-place finish.

Reggina loan
In July 2022 Pierozzi signed for Serie B club Reggina on loan for the 2022–23 Serie B season. He made his debut in a 3–1 win over S.P.A.L. He scored his first Reggina goal in a 4–0 win over F.C. Südtirol.

International career
Pierozzi has won four caps for the Italy U17 team, making his debut in a 3–0 friendly loss to France U17.

Style of play
Pierozzi plays predominantly as a right-back, but has played as a midfielder.

Personal life
Pierozzi's twin brother, Edoardo, is a professional footballer as well; the two played together during their youth team years at Fiorentina.

Career statistics

Club

References

2001 births
Living people
ACF Fiorentina players
Association football defenders
Aurora Pro Patria 1919 players
Footballers from Florence
Italian footballers
Italy youth international footballers
Reggina 1914 players
Serie B players
Serie C players